Bounty Island may refer to:

 Bounty Islands, a small group of 13 islets and numerous rocks in the south Pacific Ocean which are territorially part of New Zealand.
 Bounty Island, the common name of Kadavulailai Island in the Mamanuca Islands group, Fiji.

See also
Bounty (disambiguation)